Johann Lesinski (1904–63) was the first and -to date- only bishop of Tingzhou, in the Ecclesiastical province of Fuzhou.

A German, Lesinski belonged to the Ordo Praedicatorum (the Dominicans). He was ordained into the priesthood in July 1932, before his 28th birthday anniversary. In May 1947 the Apostolic prefecture of Tingzhou (consisting mostly of the ROC's Changting Prefecture) was promoted to Diocesan standing and Lesiniski was named its bishop (consecrated thus in October of that year).

Struggle with National Catholicism 
Changting in Western Fujian Province was liberated by Communists a little over two years later (now renamed Longyan). Lesinski's Cathedral, in Longyan's Tingzhou town, was not deemed useful to the Sinican Catholic movement and has lain uncelebrated even since reform and opening up under Deng Xiaoping.

Lesinski died in 1963, on April 4, aged 58.

References

External links
 G Catholic website 

1904 births
1963 deaths
20th-century Roman Catholic bishops in China
20th-century German Roman Catholic priests